HD 145377 is a star in the southern constellation Scorpius. It has an apparent visual magnitude of 8.10 and can be viewed with a small telescope. The star is located at a distance of 175 light years from the Sun based on parallax, and it is drifting further away with a radial velocity of +11.6. The absolute magnitude of this star is 4.31, indicating it would be visible to the naked eye if it were at a distance of 10 parsecs.

This is an ordinary G-type main-sequence star with a stellar classification of G3V, which indicates it is undergoing core hydrogen fusion. It is 5–12% larger and 13% more massive than the Sun. It may be younger than the Sun, with age estimates in the range of 1–3 billion years. The star is spinning with a projected rotational velocity of 3.85 km/s, giving it a rotation period of ~12 days. The abundance of elements more massive than helium – what astronomers term the star's metallicity – is ~31% higher than in the Sun. The star is radiating around 43% to 56% of the luminosity of the Sun from its photosphere at an effective temperature of 6,046 K.


Planetary system
In October 2008 an extrasolar planet, HD 145377 b, was reported to be orbiting this star. This object was detected using the radial velocity method by search programs conducted using the HARPS spectrograph. It is a super-Jupiter in an eccentric orbit with a period of 104 days.

See also 
 List of extrasolar planets

References

External links
 

G-type main-sequence stars
Planetary systems with one confirmed planet
Scorpius (constellation)
Durchmusterung objects
145377
079346